"Innocence" is a song by British dubstep trio Nero. It was released in the United Kingdom as a digital download on 26 April 2010 as the lead single from the debut studio album, Welcome Reality – also acting as a double A-side with the track "Electron". The single peaked at number 167 on the UK Singles Chart, also reaching number 15 and number 16 on the independent releases chart and dance chart respectively.

Music video
A music video to accompany the release of "Innocence" was first posted onto YouTube on 2 April 2010.
It is composed almost entirely from clips of the anime OVA series, Cyber City Oedo 808.

Track listing

Charts

Release history

References

2010 singles
Nero (band) songs
MTA Records singles
2010 songs